Jebel Faya (FAY-NE1) is an archaeological site and limestone hill or escarpment near Al Madam in the Emirate of Sharjah, the UAE, located about  east of the city of Sharjah, and between the shoreline of the Gulf and Al Hajar Mountains. It contains tool assemblages from the Paleolithic, Neolithic, Iron Age, and Bronze Age. Because its deepest assemblage has been dated to 125,000 years ago, it was thought to be the world's most ancient settlement yet discovered of anatomically modern humans outside of Africa at the time of its discovery in 2011. Finds of a yet earlier date (50,000 years) have since been found at Misliya cave in the Levant.

The finds from excavations at Faya and surrounding digs are displayed at the Mleiha Archaeological Centre.

Site history 

Excavations at Jebel Faya were first conducted between 2003 and 2010 by Simon J. Armitage, Sabah A. Jasim, Anthony E. Marks, Adrian G. Parker, Vitaly I. Usik, and Hans-Peter Uerpmann. Knut Bretzke, Nicholas J. Conard, and Hans-Peter Uerpmann also reported on the FAY-NE1 sequence after conducting excavations between 2009 and 2013. Additional excavations have studied the site's environmental and geologic context (see Bretzke et al. 2013, Parton et al. 2015, and Rosenberg et al. 2011). Although Jebel Faya's Paleolithic-aged context has been more intensively studied, in 2013 Hans-Peter Uerpmann, Margarethe Uerpmann, Adelina Kutterer, and Sabah A. Jasim published findings on the Neolithic period at the site.

Findings

Site description 
The archaeological site itself is called FAY-NE1, a rock shelter located at the northeastern endpoint of Jebel Faya. Archaeologists have excavated several trenches at the site, with an area of over 150 meters2 excavated in total.

Environmental context 
Paleolithic occupations at Jebel Faya have been linked to humid periods in southern Arabia, in which freshwater availability and vegetation cover of the area would have increased and supported human subsistence. In 2013, Bretzke et al. analyzed sediment columns from trenches at FAY-NE1. While Assemblages A, B, and C showed evidence of vegetation, the layers lacking archaeological deposits showed evidence of desiccation. Additional studies of alluvial fan records and relic lake deposits in the region have supported this theory that humid periods may have offered multiple opportunities for human dispersal in southern Arabia.

Deposits 
The Paleolithic layers at FAY-NE1 were first described by Armitage et al. and were dated using single-grain optically stimulated luminescence (OSL). The horizons are as follows, from top to bottom:

 Assemblage A
Dated to approximately 40,000 years ago. Recovered tools include burins, retouched pieces, end scrapers, sidescrapers, and denticulates.

 Assemblage B
Not yet dated. Recovered tools resemble those of Assemblage A.

 Assemblage C
Dated to approximately 125,000 years ago. Recovered tools include small hand axes, foliates, end scrapers and sidescrapers, and denticulates. Evidence of the Levallois production technique is unique to Assemblage C.

Stone tools are thought to have been associated with Homo sapiens living in Africa at that time, and this shows that modern sapiens may have expanded Africa more quickly than thought.

Paleolithic Assemblages D and E are also present, but have not been discussed in detail due to a small number of finds.

Neolithic levels 
The Neolithic levels at FAY-NE1 consist of approximately 1 meter of sediment. A layer of sand above Assemblage A seals the Neolithic context from the Paleolithic. This layer contains Faya arrowheads and shell fragments, dated to about 9500 years BP. Hans-Peter Uerpmann and his colleagues attribute these artifacts to the first reoccupation of the site since its last abandonment in the Paleolithic. The layers above this sand level are less distinct and have not provided significant information about late Neolithic occupation.

Significance 
Although no human fossils have been found at Jebel Faya, Armitage and others have argued that the Assemblage C artifacts, dated to 125,000 years BP, were produced by anatomically modern humans (AMH). This is because Assemblage C resembles contemporary east and northeast African technology more than the technology found at sites elsewhere on the Arabian peninsula. As a result, the evidence at Jebel Faya has been used to support the idea of an early dispersal of AMH from the Horn of Africa across southern Arabia and into southern Asia. According to this theory, modern humans dispersed out of Africa before the eruption of the Toba supervolcano 70–75,000 years BP. This claim is based on excavations at Jwalapuram in India by Petraglia et al., who argue that assemblages found in pre- and post-Toba eruption layers indicate the continuous presence of AMH. For Petraglia and his colleagues, the presence of AMH at Jebel Faya 125,000 years ago could be evidence of an early dispersal route out of Africa, which humans could have followed to south Asia. However, there is strong opposition to this notion, as critics have argued that the Assemblage C evidence is not enough to confirm the presence of AMH from Africa. According to Paul Mellars, who believes that significant modern human dispersals did not occur until after the Toba eruption, “There's not a scrap of evidence here that these were made by modern humans, nor that they came from Africa.”

Studies about Jebel Faya's environmental context have indicated the potential for human dispersals out of Africa during humid periods in southern Arabia. These periods coincide with occupation at FAY-NE1, and depict activity at Jebel Faya as a cycle of occupation and abandonment according to the availability of water and vegetation. However, although these studies demonstrate the site's attractiveness during humid periods, there is an ongoing debate about the identity of its  occupants.

Due to their dissimilarity from any other Middle or Late Stone Age assemblages, Assemblages B and A have been attributed to indigenous developments, which may indicate that Jebel Faya was inhabited continuously. However, this conclusion has been questioned due to genetic evidence of a more rapid dispersal of AMH out of Africa, meaning the Paleolithic assemblages may be the products of unrelated populations.

At the moment, however, it is considered possible.

See also
 Skhul and Qafzeh hominids
 Middle Awash

References

External links
 Lost Civilization May Have Existed Beneath the Persian Gulf - December 10, 2010
 Nature: Early human migration written in stone tools - 27 January 2011
 Science: Did Modern Humans Travel Out of Africa Via Arabia? - 28 January 2011 (requires subscription or proxy)
 What's a prehistoric toolkit and how could it rewrite human history? – The Tools of Jebel Faya
 Jebel Faya (YouTube)
 Paragliding in U.A.E ( Jebel Faya Sharjah )
 Stone Axe 150.000 years from Jebel Faya Sharjah أداة حجرية من 150.000 سنة من جبل فاية الشارقة

Archaeological sites in the Emirate of Sharjah
Paleoanthropological sites
Al-Madam, Sharjah
Geography of the Emirate of Sharjah
Hills of the United Arab Emirates